Hoffmannseggia microphylla (syn. Caesalpinia virgata) is a species of flowering plant in the legume family known by the common name wand holdback. It is native to the southwestern United States and Baja California, where it grows in sandy and gravelly soils in the deserts.

This is a twiggy shrub producing many slender, wandlike, mostly naked stems up to two meters tall. The stems are hairy and green and have few leaves for most of the year. Before the leaves fall, they appear as twigs lined with pairs of small oval-shaped leaflets.

The shrub flowers in scattered raceme inflorescences of red-streaked yellow flowers which age to full red. The fruit is a sickle-shaped dehiscent legume pod up to 2.5 centimeters long. It is bumpy with glands and slightly hairy.

External links
Jepson Manual Treatment
USDA Plants Profile
Photo gallery

Caesalpinieae
Flora of the Sonoran Deserts
Flora of the California desert regions
Flora of Baja California
Flora of Arizona
Natural history of the Colorado Desert